Bankura Lok Sabha constituency is one of the 543 parliamentary constituencies in India. While six assembly segments of No. 36 Bankura Lok Sabha constituency are in Bankura district, one assembly segment is in Purulia district.

Assembly segments

As per order of the Delimitation Commission in 2006 in respect of the delimitation of constituencies in the West Bengal, parliamentary constituency no. 36 Bankura is composed of the following assembly segments:

Prior to delimitation, Bankura Lok Sabha constituency was composed of the following assembly segments:Para (SC) (assembly constituency no. 240), Raghunathpur (SC) (assembly constituency no. 241), Kashipur (ST) (assembly constituency no. 242), Hura (assembly constituency no. 243), Chhatna (assembly constituency no. 248), Bankura (assembly constituency no. 251) and Onda (assembly constituency no. 252)

Members of Parliament

Election results

General election 2019
Source:Source

General election 2014

General election 2009

General elections 1951-2004
Most of the contests were multi-cornered. However, only winners and runners-up are generally mentioned below:

 *In 1951 and 1957 Bankura constituency had two seats with one reserved for Scheduled Castes

See also
 List of Constituencies of the Lok Sabha

References

External links
Bankura lok sabha  constituency election 2019 result details

Lok Sabha constituencies in West Bengal
Politics of Bankura district